McFadzean is a surname. Notable people with the surname include:

Cameron McFadzean (born 1971), Australian sprint canoeist
David McFadzean, American television producer, writer and playwright
Francis McFadzean, Baron McFadzean of Kelvinside (1915–1992), British businessman
Jim McFadzean (1938–2016), Scottish footballer
Kyle McFadzean (born 1987), English footballer
William McFadzean (1895–1916), Irish World War I Victoria Cross recipient
William McFadzean, Baron McFadzean (1903–1996), British politician